Leven is both a unisex given name and a surname. People with the name include:

Given name
 Leven Cooper Allen (1894–1979), American army officer 
 Leven H. Ellis (1881–1968), American politician
 Leven Kali, Dutch singer
 Leven Powell (1737–1810), American army officer and politician
 Leven Rambin, American actress

Surname
 Andrew Baxter Leven (1885–1966), Scottish-born Australian architect
 Boris Leven (1908–1986), Russian-born American art director
 Jackie Leven (1950–2011), Scottish singer and songwriter
 Jeremy Leven (born 1941), American director and novelist
 John Levén (born 1963), Swedish musician
 Marian Leven (born 1944), Scottish artist 
 Mats Levén, Swedish singer
 Matt Vant Leven (born 1987), New Zealand rugby player
 Mel Leven (1914–2007), American composer 
 Milton M. Leven (1911—1979), American engineer
 Narcisse Leven (1833–1915), French lawyer and politician
 Peter Leven (born 1983), Scottish football player 
 Ryan Leven (born 1977), American football players
 Steve Leven (born 1982), Australian basketball player

Unisex given names
Surnames of Scottish origin
Jewish surnames